is a passenger railway station in the town of Nakanojō, Gunma Prefecture, Japan, operated by East Japan Railway Company (JR East).

Lines
Nakanojō Station is a station on the Agatsuma Line, and is located 19.8 rail kilometers from the terminus of the line at Shibukawa Station.

Station layout
The station consists of a single side platform and a single island platform connected to the station building by a footbridge. The station is staffed.

Platforms

History
Nakanojō Station was opened on 5 August 1945. The station was absorbed into the JR East network upon the privatization of the Japanese National Railways (JNR) on 1 April 1987.

Passenger statistics
In fiscal 2019, the station was used by an average of 971 passengers daily (boarding passengers only).

Surrounding area
 Nakanojō Town Hall
 Nakanojō Post Office
 Shima Onsen

See also
 List of railway stations in Japan

References

External links

 JR East Station information 

Railway stations in Gunma Prefecture
Agatsuma Line
Stations of East Japan Railway Company
Railway stations in Japan opened in 1945
Nakanojō, Gunma